Herttoniemenranta (Finnish), Hertonäs strand (Swedish) is a southeastern neighborhood of Helsinki, Finland. Herttoniemenranta is part of Herttoniemi and it was built in the late 1990s and early 2000s.

Herttoniemi